Nadia Petrova was the defending champion, but retired in the quarterfinals against Jelena Janković.

Justine Henin won the title, defeating Tatiana Golovin in the final 2–6, 6–2, 6–1.

Seeds

Draw

Finals

Top half

Bottom half

External links

2007 Porsche Tennis Grand Prix Singles
Porsche Tennis Grand Prix Singles